George James Macdonald  & Two Bars (30 September 1921 – 22 January 1982) was a New Zealand naval officer, civil engineer and inventor. He was born in Wellington, New Zealand on 30 September 1921.

References

1921 births
1982 deaths
New Zealand Companions of the Distinguished Service Order
New Zealand civil engineers
20th-century New Zealand inventors
Royal New Zealand Navy personnel of World War II
People from Wellington City
Recipients of the Distinguished Service Cross (United Kingdom)